The Messenger is the debut album from Melbourne-based artist Matt Joe Gow, released in Australia on 18 July 2009.

Produced by Nash Chambers, the album features instrumental contributions from Jim Moginie of Midnight Oil and Bill Chambers as well as vocal contributions from Catherine Britt.

Track listing

Performers 
 Matt Joe Gow – Vocals, Acoustic and Electric Guitar, Harmonica, Percussion, Piano
 Andrew Pollock – Electric Guitar, Vocals
 Kain Borlase – Bass guitar
 Chris Elliott – Drums
 James van Cuylenburg - Piano
 Jim Moginie – Electric Guitar, Hammond Organ, Harmonium, Mandolin
 John Watson – Drums
 Michel Rose – Pedal Steel
 Mick Albreck – Fiddle
 Bill Chambers – Lap Steel
 Catherine Britt – Vocals on "At The Seams" and "Things Fall Apart"

References 

 http://www.liberation.com.au/artists/release/The_Messenger

2009 albums